Tantrāloka is the masterwork of Abhinavagupta, a writer and philosopher of the Kashmir Shaivism school of Hindu philosophy.

Overview 
The work contains the synthesis of the 64 monistic āgamas and the different schools of tantra. It discussed both ritualistic and philosophic aspects in 37 chapters; the first chapter contains the essential teachings in condensed form. On account of its size and scope it is considered an encyclopedia of the nondual school of Hindu tantra.

Tantrāloka was written in the 10th century and, after Kashmir Shaivism all but disappeared, it was rediscovered in old manuscripts towards the end of the 19th century. 

Its only complete translation into a European language to-date – Italian – is credited to Raniero Gnoli, now at its second edition. The esoteric chapter 29 on the Kaula ritual was translated in English together with Jayaratha'''s commentary by John R. Dupuche. 

A complex study on the context, authors, contents and references of Tantrāloka was published by Navjivan Rastogi, Prof. of the Lucknow University. Though there are no English translations of Tantrāloka to date, the last recognized master of the oral tradition of Kashmir Shaivism, Swami Lakshman Joo, gave a condensed version of the key philosophical chapters of Tantrāloka in his book, Kashmir Shaivism – The Secret Supreme''.

References

Sources 
 
 
 

Kashmir Shaivism
Esoteric schools of thought
Hindu tantra
Shaiva texts